John Joseph Hickey (August 22, 1911 – September 22, 1970) was an American judge and politician who served the 24th Governor of Wyoming and Senator as a Democrat before sitting on the Court of Appeals for the Tenth Circuit. He was the first Governor of Wyoming to be born in the 20th century.

Life

John Joseph Hickey was born in Rawlins, Wyoming to John Joseph Hickey and Brigit O'Meara on August 22, 1911. He attended public schools in Rawlins where he graduated in 1929 and then graduated with a law degree from the University of Wyoming College of Law with in 1934. He practiced law in Rawlins from 1934 to 1942. Hickey served as city treasurer of Rawlins from 1935 to 1940 and was county attorney of Carbon County from 1939 to 1942.

In 1942 he joined the army as a private and after serving for forty two months rose to the rank of captain. On December 25, 1945, he was honorably discharged and on January 15, 1946, he married Winifred Epsy. He served as county attorney of Carbon County from 1946 to 1949 and in 1949 President Harry S. Truman appointed Hickey as the United States district attorney for Wyoming. In 1954 he was elected as chairman of the Wyoming Democratic Party and served until 1958.

Governor and Senator

He was the Governor of Wyoming from 1958 to 1960. At the 1960 Democratic National Convention Senate Majority Leader Lyndon B. Johnson asked Hickey to second his nomination for the presidency which he did. During the 1960 presidential election Hickey stated that the issue over Kennedy's Catholicism would not be important in Wyoming due to Hickey, who was also a Catholic, having won in 1958. As Governor, he appointed himself as United States Senator from Wyoming from 1961 to 1962, but lost election in 1962. On October 15, 1962, he suffered a heart attack, but recovered.

Tenth Circuit

He was in private practice of law in Rawlins from 1962 to 1966. Hickey was nominated by President Lyndon B. Johnson on May 12, 1966, to a seat on the United States Court of Appeals for the Tenth Circuit vacated by Judge John Coleman Pickett. He was confirmed by the United States Senate on June 9, 1966, and received his commission the same day.

In July 1970 he was hospitalized for a stomach ulcer and in August he went to the Presbyterian Medical Center in Denver for lung cancer treatment. On September 22, 1970, he died in a Cheyenne hospital.

Electoral history

References

1911 births
1970 deaths
20th-century American judges
20th-century American politicians
20th-century Roman Catholics
United States Army personnel of World War II
Catholics from Wyoming
Democratic Party governors of Wyoming
Democratic Party United States senators from Wyoming
Judges of the United States Court of Appeals for the Tenth Circuit
People from Rawlins, Wyoming
United States Attorneys for the District of Wyoming
United States Army officers
United States court of appeals judges appointed by Lyndon B. Johnson
University of Wyoming College of Law alumni
Wyoming lawyers